Googly is a 2013 Indian Kannada language romantic comedy film directed by Pavan Wadeyar and produced by Jayanna Combines, starring Yash and Kriti Kharbanda in the lead roles, while Ananth Nag and Sadhu Kokila play the primary supporting roles. The film released on 19 July 2013. The film was a box office success by receiving highly positive reviews. 

The film won multiple nominations at the 3rd South Indian International Movie Awards. Having been nominated in 11 categories, the film won SIIMA awards for Best Director (Pavan Wadeyar), Best Cinematographer (Vaidi S.), Best Lyricist (Pavan Wadeyar) and Best Fight Choreographer (Ravi Varma). The copyrights for the Bengali remake was sold to Eskay Movies.

Plot
Sharath is a fun-loving engineering student who seldom has any friends because of his unusual attitude, and also hates girls, but likes love and always lives his life as he wishes. One day he is selected to represent his college at the Global Business Seminar, as he is the topper of his university. When Sharath enters the crowded auditorium, he gets bored with the seminar and falls asleep. When his name is called upon, he is woken up by Swathi who is an MBBS student. Sharath gives his hilarious speech and thanks Swathi for waking him up. By this meet, both of them become close friends and start to love each other. Over a period of time, Sharath starts to suspect every act of Swathi. 

One day, Swathi is injured and things become more complicated when he misunderstands Swathi's friend to be her boyfriend at a hospital where she is undergoing treatment. As a result, Sharath gets annoyed and slaps Swathi. Unlike any guy who'll normally brood over his past girlfriend, Sharath takes this as a challenge and devotes his time to his career, and becomes a huge business tycoon within couple of years. After few years, Sharath realises his mistake of hurting Swathi and tries to reconcile with her by apologizing to her through a phone call on her birthday, but is hurt to hear that Swathi is getting engaged to someone and she never had such feeling for him. Later, he returns to India to attend his friend's wedding in Mangalore, and is surprised to see Swathi and he learns that they both will attend the same wedding. 

Upon further conversation with Swathi, he discovers that Swathi had lied to him regarding her engagement to get rid of him, because she didn't have the strength to be heartbroken again if Sharath would leave her for the second time. Thus, he tries to win her heart again. Swathi later decides to reciprocate it but on their way back home, A North Indian gang, who were thrashed by Sharath for separating two lovers, attacks him. After admitting Sharath in the hospital, Swathi donates her blood to Sharath where Sharath's mother Kousalya scolds Swathi and she leaves without informing anyone. Sharath manages to find her in train station with the support of the media. When she replies she had lost her accessories and ticket in the station, where Sharath tells her that in spite of going through so much pain to find her she is lamenting the loss of something trivial. They reconcile with each other.

Cast

 Yash as Sharath, a rich businessman who hates women but falls in love with Swathi
 Kriti Kharbanda as Dr Swathi, a medical student from Mysore falls in love with Sharath and later she becomes doctor in a government hospital 
 Anant Nag as Sharath's father 
 Sudha Belawadi as Kausalya (Sharath's mother)
 Sadhu Kokila as Musthafa (reprising his role from O Mallige)
 Neenasam Ashwath as Ravi Joshi
 Deepu as Madhu, Swathi's friend 
 Ashok Sharma as Sharath's friend
 M. N. Lakshmi Devi
 Gopal Krushna Raul as a Sharath's friend
 Pavan Wadeyar in special appearance in "Yeno Yeno Aagide"
 Saurav Lokesh as local goon

Production

Choreography and music
Palaniraj and Ravi Verma choreographed the action scenes, with dance choreography done by Murali. Joshua Sridhar composed the score and soundtrack while ace Kannada music composer and state awardee Anoop Seelin scored the background music. Lyrics were written by Yogaraj Bhat, Jayanth Kaikini, Pavan Wadeyar and Kaviraj.

Filming
Filming took place in the cities of Bengaluru and Mangaluru with the climax scene shot at the railway station in Sakleshpura in Hassan district.

Soundtrack

The soundtrack music for the film was composed by Joshua Sridhar and the background music for the film was scored by Anoop Seelin. The lyrics for the soundtracks were penned by Jayant Kaikini, Yogaraj Bhat, Kaviraj and Pavan Wadeyar. The album consisting of six soundtracks was released on 3 June 2013, in Bangalore.

Critical reception
The film opened to generally positive reviews from critics upon release. G. S. Kumar of The Times of India reviewed the film and gave a 3.5/5 rating writing, "Armed with a good script, director Pavan Wadeyar has done a good job of a romantic story with neat narration and screenplay capturing the trauma of a young industrialist..." He concludes crediting the performances of Yash, Kharbanda, and the film's music and cinematography. Bangalore Mirror in its review wrote, "Wadeyar is in complete control of the proceedings. Though most part of the film focuses on the leading pair, there is hardly a dull moment. His dialogues are brimming with wit and humour." and added, " Yash is at his best and truly establishes himself as a star material in Sandalwood. Kriti’s charm continues and she is sure to 'wound more hearts' in the gallery in this film as well." Writing of Deccan Herald, B. S. Srivani rated the film 3/5 and praised the performances of the actors and gave a special mention to the film's music. Of the music, she wrote, "the film’s music plays an important part in shoving the aberration aside. Both Anoop Seelin and Joshua Sridhar come up with scintillating scores. That the tunes are catchy and are a rage is not surprising at all. Seelin’s background score is refreshing and complements Joshua’s work nicely."

Box office
Released on 19 July 2013, Googly, according to box office reports earned more than a crore on the first day and  within the first four days of its release. According to the producer, the film collected  gross at the box office in its first week. The film completed a 100-day run in theaters, and grossed  at the box office.

References

External links 

2013 films
2010s Kannada-language films
Indian romantic comedy films
Kannada films remade in other languages
Films directed by Pavan Wadeyar
2013 romantic comedy films
Films scored by Joshua Sridhar